The von Neumann family (also spelled de Neuman) is a Jewish family that was elevated to the ranks of nobility in Austria-Hungary.

History
In 1830 Francis II, Holy Roman Emperor created the title Baron of Neumann for Philipp von Neumann. In 1913 Franz Joseph I of Austria elevated three branches of the family to noble rank. One branch of the family, von Neumann de Végvár, were elevated to the rank of baron. The first three members of the family to be created Barons of Végvár were Adolf and Dániel Neumann. Later that year Franz Joseph I elevated Miksa von Neumann to the landed nobility. This branch was given the nobiliary particle and style von Neymann de Margitta. Another branch of the family Neumann von Héthárs were granted the rank of hereditary knight by the emperor.

Notable family members 
 Baron Philipp von Neumann (1781–1851), diplomat
 Heinrich Neumann Ritter von Héthárs (1873–1939), otorhinolaryngologist
 John von Neumann (1903–1957), mathematician
 Klara Dan von Neumann (1911–1963), computer scientist
 Angela von Neumann (1928–2010), artist
 Marina von Neumann Whitman (b. 1935), economist
 Frederick Bernard de Neumann (1943–2018), mathematician
 Monica von Neumann (1964–2019), socialite

Sources
 Béla Kempelen: Magyar nemes családok (VII. kötet)
 János Gudenus: A magyarországi főnemesség XX. századi genealógiája

Austrian noble families
Hungarian noble families
Jewish-Hungarian families
Von Neumann family